Mila Doce ("Mile Twelve" in Spanish, from the name of the road it adjoins) is a census-designated place (CDP) in Hidalgo County, Texas. The population was 6,222 at the 2010 United States Census. It is part of the McAllen–Edinburg–Mission Metropolitan Statistical Area.

Geography
Mila Doce is located at  (26.221238, -97.961795).

Demographics
As of the census of 2000, there were 4,907 people, 1,020 households, and 974 families residing in the CDP. The population density was 1,492.2 people per square mile (575.9/km2). There were 1,147 housing units at an average density of 348.8/sq mi (134.6/km2). The racial makeup of the CDP was 94.74% White, 0.20% Native American, 4.26% from other races, and 0.79% from two or more races. Hispanic or Latino of any race were 99.53% of the population. Mila Doce has the highest percentage of Hispanics among United States census-designated places.

There were 1,020 households, out of which 70.1% had children under the age of 18 living with them, 76.6% were married couples living together, 14.8% had a female householder with no husband present, and 4.5% were non-families. 3.9% of all households were made up of individuals, and 1.6% had someone living alone who was 65 years of age or older. The average household size was 4.81 and the average family size was 4.89.

In the CDP, the population was spread out, with 43.9% under the age of 18, 14.2% from 18 to 24, 25.9% from 25 to 44, 12.4% from 45 to 64, and 3.6% who were 65 years of age or older. The median age was 21 years. For every 100 females, there were 96.2 males. For every 100 females age 18 and over, there were 93.8 males.

The median income for a household in the CDP was $15,944, and the median income for a family was $16,716. Males had a median income of $15,828 versus $15,025 for females. The per capita income for the CDP was $4,221. About 59.1% of families and 66.2% of the population were below the poverty line, including 72.9% of those under age 18 and 62.0% of those age 65 or over.

Education
Most of Mila Doce is served by the Weslaco Independent School District. Portions of the community are zoned to multiple WISD elementary schools: Justice Gonzales, Mario Ybarra, North Bridge,  "Tony" Rico, and Airport Drive. Two middle schools, Mary Hoge and Central, serve WISD sections of Mila Doce. Weslaco East High School and Weslaco High School serve WISD sections of Mila Doce.

A small portion is zoned to the Edcouch-Elsa Independent School District. The schools in grades 6-12 serving the section are: P.F.C. David Ybarra Middle School, Carlos F. Truan Junior High School, and Edcouch Elsa High School.

In addition, South Texas Independent School District operates magnet schools that serve the community.

References

Census-designated places in Hidalgo County, Texas
Census-designated places in Texas